Cascade Locks School is a public school in Cascade Locks, Oregon, United States. Opened in 1949, the school included high school grades until 2009. The school includes grades K through 5.

History
In 2008, 57% of the school's seniors received a high school diploma. Of 14 students, eight graduated, four dropped out, and two were still in high school the following year.

When it had high school grades, the school was part of the Oregon School Activities Association at the 1A level in the Big Sky League.

In 2007, the high school fielded a football team for the first time in nearly 20 years.

References

Schools in Hood River County, Oregon
Public middle schools in Oregon
Public elementary schools in Oregon
Public high schools in Oregon
1949 establishments in Oregon
Educational institutions established in 1949